M.E.S. Indian School is an English medium private school for boys and girls in Doha, Qatar that was established in 1974. It is one of the first schools to be established in Qatar. It is affiliated to the Central Board of Secondary Education (CBSE) and follows the latest curriculum from the CBSE.

Notable staff 
 , former teacher

References

External links 
 

Educational institutions established in 1974
Indian international schools in Qatar
1974 establishments in Qatar